Veritas Christian School is a private, classical Christian school located in Lawrence, Kansas, United States.  It is non-denominational and is supported by the tuition and donations from students and alumni.  Veritas is a member of the  Association of Classical and Christian Schools (ACCS) and a member of the Association of Christian Schools International (ACSI).

History
It was opened in 1978 with the name of Douglas County Christian School.

In 1998, the pursuit of academic improvement was enhanced by the implementation of a classical method of instruction.

At the start of 2004 school year, grades 10th through 12th grades were added to Veritas, thereby offering a complete educational process for children from Kindergarten through 12th grade.

On-site library and computer lab facilities are provided.  It has a playground and open areas for recess activities, the multi-purpose room for P.E. and school assemblies, and a hot lunch program.

References

External links
 Veritas Christian School website

1978 establishments in Kansas
Christian schools in Kansas
Classical Christian schools
Educational institutions established in 1978
Private elementary schools in Kansas
Private high schools in Kansas
Private middle schools in Kansas
Schools in Lawrence, Kansas